Donje Ceranje is a village within the town Benkovac.

Demographics
According to the 2011 census, the village of Donje Ceranje has 22 inhabitants. This represents 7.46% of its pre-war population according to the 1991 census.

The 1991 census recorded that 92.20% of the village population were ethnic Serbs (272/295), 6.44% were Croats (19/295) while 1.36% were of other ethnic origin (4/295).

NOTE: The 1857, 1869, 1921 and 1931 population figures also include the population of the Gornje Ceranje village.

Notable natives and residents
 Milorad Pupovac, a notable Croatian Serb politician was born in Donje Ceranje.

References

Benkovac
Populated places in Zadar County
Serb communities in Croatia